Ionel "Jerry" Tersinio Gane (born 12 October 1971) is a Romanian football coach and former player.

Playing career 
Born in Drănic, Gane played professionally in Romania for Universitatea Craiova, Electroputere Craiova, Dinamo București, Rapid București, and Argeş Piteşti; in Spain for CA Osasuna; in Switzerland for FC St. Gallen and Grasshopper Zürich; in China for Tianjin Kangshifu; and in Germany for VfL Bochum.

He also represented Romania at international level.

International stats

Coaching career 
In July 2009, he started working as assistant coach for FC Brașov. He was also an interim coach for FC Universitatea Craiova, during which time the club played a match against FC Dinamo Bucharest.

In September 2013, he became head coach of newly promoted in Liga I Corona Brașov.

He became manager of Petrolul Ploiești in March 2016, and CSM Râmnicu Vâlcea in June 2016, leaving that position in December 2016.

In February 2017, he was appointed assistant coach of Dinamo București under Cosmin Contra. In September 2017 he took up a similar role with the Romania national team.

In August 2020, he returned to Dinamo, again as assistant coach under Contra. In December 2020 he became head coach after Contra's departure from the club. He resigned on 15 March 2021, after a series of seven games without a win in Liga I.

Trivia
His name is Tersinio because his father was a fan of Brazil's 1970 World Cup winning team and his favourite player from that team was Jairzinho, but he wrote the name by the way he used to pronounce it: Jersinio, that is why Ionel's nickname is Jerry. Later when Ionel was 14 years old and had to get an identity card, the people who made the card misspelled the name putting the letter "t " instead of "j", thus resulting Tersinio.

Honours
Electroputere Craiova
Divizia B: 1990–91
Universitatea Craiova
Cupa României: 1992–93
Divizia B: 2005–06

St. Gallen
Nationalliga A: 1999–2000

References

External links 
 
 
 

1971 births
Living people
People from Dolj County
Romanian footballers
Romania international footballers
Association football forwards
FC Dinamo București players
FC U Craiova 1948 players
FC Argeș Pitești players
FC Rapid București players
FC St. Gallen players
VfL Bochum players
Tianjin Jinmen Tiger F.C. players
Grasshopper Club Zürich players
CA Osasuna players
Swiss Super League players
Liga I players
Segunda División players
2. Bundesliga players
Chinese Super League players
Romanian expatriate footballers
Expatriate footballers in Switzerland
Romanian expatriate sportspeople in Switzerland
Expatriate footballers in China
Romanian expatriate sportspeople in China
Expatriate footballers in Germany
Romanian expatriate sportspeople in Germany
Expatriate footballers in Spain
Romanian expatriate sportspeople in Spain
Romanian football managers
CS Universitatea Craiova managers
FC Petrolul Ploiești managers
CSM Corona Brașov (football) managers
FC U Craiova 1948 managers
FC Dinamo București managers